Enns or ENNS may refer to:

Enns (town), Upper Austria, Austria
Enns (river), a southern tributary of the Danube River
Enns (surname)
Enns-class river monitor, two ships of the Austro-Hungarian Navy
European Neural Network Society (ENNS)